The Otamatapaio River is a river in North Otago, New Zealand. It rises in the Hawkdun Range and flows north-eastward into Lake Benmore.

See also
List of rivers of New Zealand

References

Rivers of Otago
Rivers of New Zealand